Ethmia ogovensis is a moth in the family Depressariidae. It is found in Africa.

References

Moths described in 1913
ogovensis